Alan Lehman Matheney (November 6, 1950 – September 28, 2005) was an American convicted of beating to death his ex-wife, Lisa Bianco, with a .410 bore shotgun while on an eight-hour release from prison on March 4, 1989. At the time he was serving a sentence at Pendleton Correctional Facility for battery and confinement of Bianco. 

He was convicted of burglary and murder. He was executed by lethal injection on September 28, 2005 at Indiana State Prison at Michigan City. Time of death was announced as 12:27 a.m.

The eight-hour release pass authorized Matheney to travel to Indianapolis; instead he travelled to St. Joseph County. He changed clothes and took an unloaded shotgun from a friend's house. He then traveled to Mishawaka and parked his car two houses down from Bianco's home. He broke into her house through the back door and then chased her down the street. He caught and beat her to death with the shotgun while his two daughters and numerous neighbors looked on. Even so, this case was held up on appeals for 16 years. The case caused a law change in the state of Indiana, which required victims to be informed if an inmate was released. The State also agreed to pay the estate of Bianco $900,000 in compensation.

At his trial he argued that he was legally insane. One mental health professional diagnosed him as having schizophreniform disorder and another said he had paranoid personality disorder with psychotic delusions. None said he was legally insane at the time of the crime. Matheney stated that he believed Bianco was in a conspiracy against him.

He refused to appear before a hearing of the Indiana Parole Board on September 19. Then on September 24, 2005 the Indiana Supreme Court ruled 5-0 to reject a request for a new trial. Finally, Governor Mitch Daniels denied clemency on September 27.

His lawyer released a final statement that read:
I love my family and my children. I'm sorry for the pain I've caused them. I thank my friends who stood by me … I'm sure my grandchildren will grow up happy and healthy in the care of their wonderful parents.

This was the fifth execution in the state in 2005. This is the most executions in a calendar year in Indiana since executions were resumed in 1977.

See also
 Capital punishment in Indiana
 Capital punishment in the United States
 List of people executed in Indiana
 List of people executed in the United States in 2005

References

General references
News Report of Death.

Clark County Prosecutor
Amnesty International report
  Offender Data from Indiana Department of Corrections

20th-century criminals
21st-century executions by Indiana
American people convicted of burglary
American people executed for murder
1989 murders in the United States
People convicted of murder by Indiana
People executed by Indiana by lethal injection
21st-century executions of American people
People with paranoid personality disorder
 People from Butler County, Ohio
1950 births
2005 deaths